Ridge Township is one of the thirteen townships of Wyandot County, Ohio, United States.  The 2010 census found 524 people in the township.

Geography
Located in the northwestern corner of the county, it borders the following townships:
Biglick Township, Hancock County - north
Big Spring Township, Seneca County - northeast corner
Crawford Township - east
Salem Township - southeast corner
Richland Township - south
Amanda Township, Hancock County - west

No municipalities are located in Ridge Township.

Name and history
Statewide, the only other Ridge Township is located in Van Wert County.

Government
The township is governed by a three-member board of trustees, who are elected in November of odd-numbered years to a four-year term beginning on the following January 1. Two are elected in the year after the presidential election and one is elected in the year before it. There is also an elected township fiscal officer, who serves a four-year term beginning on April 1 of the year after the election, which is held in November of the year before the presidential election. Vacancies in the fiscal officership or on the board of trustees are filled by the remaining trustees.

References

External links
County website

Townships in Wyandot County, Ohio
Townships in Ohio